Gjurov (feminine Gjurova) is a Macedonian surname. Notable people with the surname include:

Marjan Gjurov (born 1980), Macedonian basketball player

See also
Gurov
Gyurov

Macedonian-language surnames